The Suess effect, also referred to as the 13C Suess effect, is a change in the ratio of the atmospheric concentrations of heavy isotopes of carbon (13C and 14C) by the admixture of large amounts of fossil-fuel derived CO2, which is depleted in 13CO2 and contains no 14CO2. It is named for the Austrian chemist Hans Suess, who noted the influence of this effect on the accuracy of radiocarbon dating. More recently, the Suess effect has been used in studies of climate change. The term originally referred only to dilution of atmospheric 14CO2. The concept was later extended to dilution of  13CO2 and to other reservoirs of carbon such as the oceans and soils.

Carbon isotopes 
Carbon has three naturally occurring isotopes. About 99% of carbon on Earth is carbon-12 (12C), about 1% is carbon-13 (13C), and a trace amount is carbon-14 (14C). The  12C and  13C isotopes are stable, while 14C decays radioactively to nitrogen-14 (14N) with a half-life of 5730 years. 14C on Earth is produced nearly exclusively by the interaction of cosmic radiation with the upper atmosphere. A 14C atom is created when a thermal neutron displaces a proton in 14N. Minuscule amounts of 14C are produced by other radioactive processes, and a significant amount was released into the atmosphere during nuclear testing before the Limited Test Ban Treaty. Natural 14C production and hence atmospheric concentration varies only slightly over time.

Plants take up 14C by fixing atmospheric carbon through photosynthesis. Animals then take 14C into their bodies when they consume plants (or consume other animals that consume plants). Thus, living plants and animals have the same ratio of 14C to 12C as the atmospheric CO2. Once organisms die they stop exchanging carbon with the atmosphere, and thus no longer take up new 14C. Radioactive decay then gradually depletes the 14C in the organism. This effect is the basis of radiocarbon dating.

Photosynthetically fixed carbon in terrestrial plants is depleted in 13C compared to atmospheric CO2. This fractionation of carbon isotopes is caused by kinetic isotope effects and mass dependence of CO2 diffusivity. The overall effect is slight in C4 plants but much greater in C3 plants which form the bulk of terrestrial biomass worldwide. Depletion in CAM plants vary between the values observed for C3 and C4 plants. In addition, most fossil fuels originate from C3 biological material produced tens to hundreds of millions of years ago. C4 plants did not become common until about 6 to 8 million years ago, and although CAM photosynthesis is present in modern relatives of the Lepidodendrales of the Carboniferous lowland forests, even if these plants also had CAM photosynthesis they were not a major component of the total biomass.

Fossil fuels such as coal and oil are made primarily of plant material that was deposited millions of years ago. This period of time equates to thousands of half-lives of 14C, so essentially all of the 14C in fossil fuels has decayed. Fossil fuels also are depleted in 13C relative to the atmosphere, because they were originally formed from living organisms. Therefore, the carbon from fossil fuels that is returned to the atmosphere through combustion is depleted in both 13C and 14C compared to atmospheric carbon dioxide.

See also 
 Environmental isotopes

References

Further reading 
  (a 25-year-long dendrochronological study (1978–2002) using stable C isotope ratio mass spectrometry in growth rings of perennial trees from the Southern Atlantic Europe that explores the Suess Effect-ecosystem relationships to examine the biome sensitivity to 13C-CO2 atmospheric changes)
  (in Northern hemisphere)
  (in the Southern Hemisphere)

External links 

 An anomalous Suess effect above Europe
 Magnitude and Origin of the Anthropogenic CO2 Increase and 13C Suess Effect in the Nordic Seas Since 1981
 Are arable soils of urban areas influenced by the atmospheric Suess-Effect?
 The need to correct for the Suess effect in the application of δ13C in sediment of autotrophic Lake Tanganyika, as a productivity proxy in the Anthropocene

Geochemistry